Kangerluarsunnguaq Fjord is a small fjord in the Sermersooq municipality in southwestern Greenland. A research station for the "Nuuk Basic" monitoring programme, erected in 2008, is located on the fjord shores.

Geography 
It splits the western tip of a peninsula off the mainland of Greenland into two, emptying into Nuup Kangerlua to the southeast of Nuuk, and to the south of the Ukkusissat mountain.

The 132 kV-powerline from Buksefjord Hydroelectric Power Plant to Nuuk crosses Kangerluarsunnguaq Fjord with a 1912 metres long span with a clearance of 63.4 metres.

References 

Fjords of Greenland
Geography of Nuuk